Endoxyla meyi is a moth in the family Cossidae. It is found in the Philippines (Luzon).

The length of the forewings is about 45 mm. The forewings are dark-brown with dark-brown strokes. The hindwings are light-brown, with a weak pattern of dark-brown strokes in the costal areas.

Etymology
The species is named in honour of Dr. Wolfram Mey.

References

Natural History Museum Lepidoptera generic names catalog

Endoxyla (moth)
Moths described in 2006